The River Roch  is a river in Greater Manchester in North West England, a tributary of the River Irwell.

Course
Rising on Chelburn Moor (south of Todmorden in the Pennines), the river flows south through Littleborough towards Rochdale where it is joined by the River Beal at Belfield, and the River Spodden from Whitworth. Turning west it runs past Heywood and Bury before meeting the River Irwell just to the east of Radcliffe.

Etymology 
The town of Rochdale is recorded as Recedham in the Domesday Book and Rachetham in 1193, with variations of Rechedham continuing into the thirteenth century. It is thought that these names represent a pre-existing Brittonic name for the river Roch, borrowed into Old English for the name of the settlement.

The early forms of Rachet-ham and Reched-ham suggest a compound of two elements, ro-ced or ro-cet. The first element is either from the common intensive prefix rö- (Modern Welsh rhy-, Cornish re-) meaning  "great" and found in other river names such as the Ribble and the Rother or rag-, (Modern Welsh ar-) meaning "opposite" or "adjacent to". The second element would then almost certainly be cę:d or cet, (Modern Welsh coed) meaning "wood". This would give the name a meaning of "River of the great wood" or "River opposite the wood".

Another etymology focused on the early forms similarities to Rheged, the Cumbric-speaking kingdom in North West England during the Middle Ages. Although this etymology is used to support the theory that the Roch may have been the centre of a separate kingdom known in Medieval Welsh literature as "South Rheged" or "Argoed" (opposite the wood), it remains unproven as the kingdom of Rheged's boundaries have not been identified. A further suggestion is that the name "rheged" simply means "area" in the Cumbric language (related to Regio in Latin and Region in Modern English) and that the kingdom of Rheged and the river merely shared a common Celtic name.

Although Rochdale is pronounced  (with a shorter o sound), the name of the river is still pronounced  (with a long vowel sound).

Later history

The river has been culverted in Rochdale town centre since the early 20th century. This was built by the joining together of seven bridges to form one large bridge, making it one of the widest bridges in the world. Maintenance work was carried out on the bridge in the 1990s and the river was uncovered temporarily. In 2015 work began on opening the bridge again in a multimillion-pound project.  On Boxing Day 2015, following heavy rain, the Roch burst its banks causing flooding in the town centre.

Tributaries
Moving upstream from the Irwell confluence, the tributaries include the following:

Parr Brook
Hollins Brook
Whittle Brook
Gigg Brook
Barn Brook
Green Brook
Gipsy Brook 
Tack Lee Brook
Wrigley Brook
Naden Brook
Plumpton Wood Brook
Millers Brook
Primrose Hill Brook
Sudden Brook
River Spodden
Moss Brook
Hey Brook
Stanney Brook
River Beal
Ash Brook
Clegg Hall Brook
Wuerdle Brook
Stubley Brook
Featherstall Brook
Ealees Brook
Town House Brook
Greenvale Brook
Chelburn Brook

Gallery

References

Rivers of Greater Manchester
Rivers of the Metropolitan Borough of Rochdale
Rivers of the Metropolitan Borough of Bury
1Roch
Roch catchment